Cory Band is one of the oldest and best known brass bands in the world, formed in 1884 in the Rhondda Valley.

History and origins
Cory Band is from the Rhondda Valley in Wales. They were formed in 1884 and originally bore the name ‘Ton Temperance’ a reference to the Temperance movement in the South Wales Valleys of the time. In 1895 Sir Clifford Cory, Chairman of Cory Brothers, heard the band and offered to provide financial assistance for them, resulting in the band's change of name to ‘Cory’. In 1920, the band gained championship status and three years later achieved the distinction of performing what is believed to have been the first radio broadcast by a brass band. A significant honour was bestowed on the band in 1976 when they were chosen to represent Wales and the Brass Band Movement on a tour of the US as part of their bi-centennial celebrations.

Titles and honours
 National Champions - 1974, 1982, 1983, 1984, 2000, 2013, 2015, 2016, 2019
 British Open Champions - 2000, 2002, 2007, 2009, 2011, 2016, 2018, 2019
 European Champions - 1980, 2008, 2009, 2010, 2013, 2016, 2019,2022
 Brass In Concert Champions - 2008, 2012, 2013, 2015, 2016, 2019
 World Music Contest Champions 2009 - 2012
 Band Cymru Champions 2014, 2016, 2018

Evolution
Cory Band has developed musically outside of the contest field. In 2001, together with the BBC National Orchestra of Wales they were appointed as resident ensemble to the Royal Welsh College of Music and Drama, and in the same year appointed Dr John Pickard as their Composer in Residence. John Pickard's tenure with the band ended in July 2005 when the band made history giving the première performance of his Gaia Symphony at the Cheltenham International Festival. The symphony was broadcast live on BBC Radio 3. Over an hour in duration, it is currently the largest scale original work in the repertory.
 
The band have an active commissioning policy and have performed works by British composers; John McCabe, Judith Bingham, Elgar Howarth, Edward Gregson, Alun Hoddinott, Karl Jenkins, Gareth Wood, David Bedford, as well as John Pickard. The band's current Associate Composer is Christopher Bond.

In 2002 the band were selected to play for the Queen's Golden Jubilee celebrations and have since performed in concert venues including the Grieg Hall, Stravinsky Hall, the Royal Albert Hall and Symphony Hall, Birmingham. In 2003, they performed with the Royal Philharmonic Orchestra at the Last Night of the Welsh Proms and were also featured during the opening celebrations of the new Wales Millennium Centre.

In 2007, following the end of the term of sponsorship from the Buy As You View company, the name of the band reverted to the name under which it has enjoyed most success: Cory Band.

In October, 2019, the band became the National Brass Band Champions of Great Britain, for the 9th time.

See also

 List of brass bands
 Music of Wales

References

British brass bands